The Battle of Helsingborg was a 1710 battle between Denmark and Sweden, part of the Great Northern War.

The Battle of Helsingborg may also refer to: 

 Battle of Helsingborg (1362), part of the Danish–German War, fought between Denmark and the Hanseatic League
 Battle of Helsingborg (1535), during the Count's Feud